Les Sans Culottes is a French-language rock band from Brooklyn, New York. The group performs mostly original material as well as some covers of French rock songs and French-language reworkings of some classic American rock songs. Their name is a reference to the citizen soldiers of the French Revolution and also the more contemporary slang term for "no underpants."

History
The band was formed in 1998 by Detroit native and Brooklyn transplant, Bill Carney, dubbed Clermont Ferrand after the industrial city in central France. Carney had travelled to France and developed a deep interest in French pop and yé-yé music of the 1960s, particularly artists such as Serge Gainsbourg, Françoise Hardy, France Gall, Jacques Dutronc and Nino Ferrer. The band made its debut in April 1998, at Freddy's Back Room, a neighborhood bar in Prospect Heights, Brooklyn.
The original lineup was singer-frontman Ferrand, vocalists Kit Kat Le Noir and Gigi Soleil, drummer Albert Camembert, bassist Jean Luc Retard, keyboardist Beau Pantalons, and guitarist Luc Panatalons - aka Le Marquis!. The band has had several line-up changes over its more than 23-year history while maintaining original vocalists Ferrand and Kit Kat Le Noir. Its current line-up consists of vocalists Clermont Ferrand, Kit Kat Le Noir and Brigitte Bourdeaux, along with drummer Jacques Strappe, guitarist, Jean L'Effete, bassist, M. Pomme-Frite, and keyboard player, Benoit Bals. 

In 2005, the band's guitarist and drummer attempted to start another French language band with some former members and others and to call themselves "Les Sans Culottes". The original group brought a trademark infringement claim in Federal Court in Manhattan which resulted in a court order barring the new group from using the name of the original group. In 2013, Les Sans Culottes singer, Clermont Ferrand, recounted the legal battle surrounding the Les Sans Culottes band name.

In July 2009 the band played its first ever shows in France, performing at La Feline and L'Opa Bastille in Paris and at the 18th annual Festival des Musiques d'ici et d'ailleurs in Châlons-en-Champagne. The group has also toured nationally across the United States and in Canada.

Their music has been featured in numerous ads, on television programs and movies, including for Hewlett-Packard digital cameras, Google Nexus S smartphone, HBO's Cathouse, Working Girls in Bed, and Entourage programs, 
FX's The Strain, MTV'S The Real World and Surf Girls and The CW's Gossip Girl as well as the movies The Hot Chick and Dalton Calhoun.

  
The band released She Is Tossed By the Waves But Doesn't Sink, its ninth album in April, 2018.

Discography
 Les Sans Culottes (1999, Escargot-Go Records)
 The Ennui and the Ecstasy (2001, Escargot-Go Records)
 Faux Realism (2002, Aeronaut)
 Full Frontal Crudité- Live in Paris (2003, Digital Club Network)
 Fixation Orale (2004, Aeronaut)
 Le Weekender (2007, Vibratone Records)
 'Pataphysical Graffiti (2012, Vibratone Records)
 The Gods Have Thirst (2014, Disques Escargot-Go)
 She Is Tossed By the Waves But Doesn't Sink (2018,  Disques Escargot-Go'')

References

External links 
 Official band web site
 Official YouTube Channel
 Les Sans Culottes SoundCloud
 Les Sans Culottes page at Vibratone Records
  Interview with Clermont Ferrand - Rocker Magazine
 Profile on The World from PRI and the BBC
 Followup on The World from PRI and the BBC
 Review of La Feline show
 Review of Châlons show in L'Union

Rock music groups from New York (state)
Musical groups from Brooklyn
Musical groups established in 1998